The 1988 edition of the Campeonato Carioca kicked off on January 30, 1988, and ended on June 22, 1988. It is the official tournament organized by FFERJ (Federação de Futebol do Estado do Rio de Janeiro, or Rio de Janeiro State Football Federation. Only clubs based in the Rio de Janeiro State are allowed to play. Twelve teams contested this edition. Vasco da Gama won the title for the 17th time. Friburguense and Goytacaz were relegated.

System
The tournament would be divided in four stages:
 Taça Guanabara: The twelve teams all played in a single round-robin format against each other. The champions qualified to the Final phase. 
 Taça Rio: The twelve teams all played in a single round-robin format against each other. The champions qualified to the Final phase and the four best teams qualified to the Third round.
 Third round: The remaining four teams all played in a single round-robin format against each other. The champions qualified to the Final phase.
 Final phase: The champions of each of the three stages would play that phase. if the same team won two of them, they would pay the other stage champion in two matches, with one bonus point.

Championship

Taça Guanabara

Taça Rio

Aggregate table

Third phase

Finals

References

Campeonato Carioca seasons
Carioca